Beningbrough is a village and civil parish in the Hambleton district of North Yorkshire, England. The population as taken at the 2011 Census was less than 100. Details are included in the civil parish of Shipton, North Yorkshire.

The parish, which includes Beningbrough Hall and Park, is bordered at the south-west by the River Ouse, beyond which is the district of Harrogate. According to the 2001 Census, parish population was 55.

Beningbrough is within the ecclesiastical parish of Shipton with Overton. The parish church of Holy Evangelists is at Shipton by Beningbrough.

Beningbrough is listed in the 1086 Domesday Book as "Benniburg", meaning a "stronghold associated with a man called 'Beonna'", being an Old English person name. At the time of the Norman Conquest, Beningbrough was in the Bulford Hundred of the North Riding of Yorkshire. The settlement contained five households and five villagers, with one-and-a-half ploughlands, three furlongs of woodland, and six acres of meadow. In 1066, Asfrith was lord, this transferred to Ralph in 1086, with Hugh fitzBaldric becoming tenant-in-chief to king William I.

Beningbrough railway station was the first station out of York on the main line to Newcastle. The station opened on the GNER line in 1841; closed to passengers in 1958, and to freight in 1965.

The racehorse Beningbrough, winner of the 1794 St Leger Stakes, was named after the village.

References

External links

Map of Beningbrough showing house names

Villages in North Yorkshire
Civil parishes in North Yorkshire